Innes Park is a coastal town and locality in the Bundaberg Region, Queensland, Australia.

Geography 
Innes Park residential area is located on a low rocky section of the coast with two small beaches either side. The northern beach is 400 metres long and has a high tide sand beach fronted by a mixture of sand and boulders at low tide. There is good road access at the southern end, with a small foredune behind the beach and a now stable sand blow at the northern end. The southern Innes Park beach straddles the mouth of Palmer Creek. It is 400 metres long and consists of a narrow strip of high tide sand fronted by a continuous, sloping boulder field, with some sand in the small creek mouth. The beach is backed by a casuarina-covered foredune and a park with BBQs, children's playground, exercise facilities, beach volleyball court, public conveniences and car parks grouped at its southern end. All four beaches are only suitable for swimming toward high tide, with low tide generally revealing a rocky shoreline. Currents in and out of the creeks can be very strong mid-tide. There are various reef breaks along this coast, which need to be checked out with the locals. You can find some good rock fishing the length of the coast, as well as in the small creek at Innes Park.

The foreshore is part of the Great Sandy Marine Park. As such, there are limits on some activities off shore. It is part of a turtle monitoring area and spearfishing, bait netting, crabbing, and line fishing are forbidden south of the mouth of Palmer Creek to past Barolin Rocks for 500m east of the low tide line

History
The Innes Park area was first occupied by European settlers in 1863, as part of the Barolin pastoral station. In 1912 the property was acquired by Sidney Innes, who in 1930 donated land to the Shire of Woongarra for recreation purposes. In the 1970s the emerging seaside town was named after the original donor.

At the 2016 census, Innes Park had a population of 2,302.

Facilities 
Facilities at Innes Park include the Innes Park Country Club, a bakery, and a creekside park with children's playground, skateboard park, beach volleyball court and public conveniences with changing rooms at the mouth of Palmer Creek. A sealed footpath runs from the bakery to the foreshore and along the foreshore and esplanade to Barolan Rocks and thence to the golf links at the Coral Coast resort. Barolin Rocks is a popular snorkel diving site.  The Coral Cove resort and residential development is immediately south of the town and includes a golf course with club house and a small convenience store.

References

External links
 Bundaberg Regional Council - Official website
 University of Queensland: Queensland Places: Innes Park

Towns in Queensland
Coastal towns in Queensland
Bundaberg Region
Localities in Queensland